David Walton is an American short story writer, novelist and critic.

Life
He is semi-retired from University of Pittsburgh Kenneth P. Dietrich School of Arts and Sciences in Oakland, now teaching mainly in the university's Osher Lifelong Learning Institute.
He lives in Pittsburgh, Pennsylvania.

Awards
 1983 Flannery O'Connor Award for Short Fiction

Works

Criticism

References

External links
 
 

20th-century American novelists
21st-century American novelists
American male novelists
Writers from Pittsburgh
University of Pittsburgh faculty
Living people
American male short story writers
20th-century American short story writers
21st-century American short story writers
20th-century American male writers
21st-century American male writers
Novelists from Pennsylvania
Year of birth missing (living people)